"We Gonna Move to the Outskirts of Town" is a song originally recorded on September 3, 1936, by Piedmont blues musician Casey Bill Weldon. Weldon performed it as a solo piece, with vocals and acoustic guitar plus piano and double bass accompaniment.

The song has been adapted and recorded by many other musicians, most often under the title "I'm Gonna Move to the Outskirts of Town", and sometimes simply "Outskirts of Town".  In 1941, Louis Jordan and His Tympany Five recorded "I'm Gonna Move to the Outskirts of Town" (Decca 8593), and the following year recorded another version as "I'm Gonna Leave You on the Outskirts of Town", with the writing credit given to Roy Jacobs and Casey Bill Weldon (Decca 8638).  This second recording became the first of Jordan's many R&B chart hits, reaching No.3 on Billboard 's newly-established "Harlem Hit Parade" chart in October 1942.

Other recordings 

 1942Count Basie and His Orchestra, Columbia 36601
 1942Big Bill and his Chicago Five, Columbia 37196
 1942Jimmie Lunceford and His Orchestra, Decca 18324
 1955Jack Montrose, on the album Arranged/Played/Composed by Jack Montrose
 1960Mel Tormé, on the album I Dig the Duke! I Dig the Count!
 1961Ray Charles, ABC-Paramount Records single which reached No. 84 on the Billboard Hot 100; appears in the end credits of the 2006 "Johnny Cakes" episode of U.S. TV series  The Sopranos
 1961The Everly Brothers, single, included on the 1965 album Rock'n Soul
 1962Lou Rawls, on the album Stormy Monday
 1964Rod Stewart, B-side of his Decca single "Good Morning Little Schoolgirl"
 1967Jimmy Witherspoon, on the album The Blues Is Now
 1968Albert King, on the live album Thursday Night in San Francisco
 1968The Big Band Sound of Thad Jones/Mel Lewis featuring Miss Ruth Brown
 1970The Allman Brothers Band, live recording, included on Fillmore East, February 1970; a rare rehearsal recording included on Brothers and Sisters (Deluxe edition), a live recording from Ludlow Garage 1970 included on Idlewild South (Deluxe edition)
 1972Muddy Waters, on the album The London Muddy Waters Sessions
 1979Buddy Guy, on the album The Blues Giant, later released as Stone Crazy!
 1983Albert King and Stevie Ray Vaughan, on the live album In Session
 1999B. B. King, on the album Let the Good Times Roll
 2000Willie Nelson and Keb' Mo', on the album Milk Cow Blues
 2008David Sanborn, on the album Here and Gone

References 

1936 songs
Blues songs
Songs written by Casey Bill Weldon
The Allman Brothers Band songs
Big Bill Broonzy songs
Ray Charles songs
Count Basie
The Everly Brothers songs
Louis Jordan songs
Albert King songs
B.B. King songs
Muddy Waters songs
Lou Rawls songs
Rod Stewart songs
Stevie Ray Vaughan songs